Safety Zone may refer to:

 Safety Zone (album), a 1975 album by Bobby Womack
 "Safety Zone" (song), a 2013 song by DMTN
 "Safety Zone", a 2022 song by J-Hope from Jack in the Box
 Nanking Safety Zone, a former demilitarized zone in China